Sevara Rejemetova (born 1 January 1994) is a Kazakhstani handball player for Kazygurt Handball and the Kazakhstani national team.

She represented Kazakhstan at the 2019 World Women's Handball Championship.

References

1994 births
Living people
Kazakhstani female handball players
Handball players at the 2018 Asian Games
21st-century Kazakhstani women